Kempton Greene (June 28, 1889 – May 17, 1939) was an American film actor of the silent era. He appeared in more than 80 films between 1911 and 1921. He was born in Philadelphia, Pennsylvania.

Selected filmography
 Brown of Harvard (1911)
The Daughters of Men (1914)
 The Eyes of Mystery (1918)
 Brown of Harvard (1918)
 Our Little Wife (1918)
 Fool's Gold (1919)
 My Little Sister (1919)
 Sentimental Tommy (1921)
 Ten Nights in a Bar Room (1921)
 Behind Masks (1921)
The Family Closet (1921)

External links

1889 births
1939 deaths
American male silent film actors
Male actors from Philadelphia
20th-century American male actors